John S. C. Dovey (September 19, 1865 – ?) was the co-owner of the Boston Doves of the National League with his brother George Dovey from  through , and later sole principal owner for the  season. He was born in Philadelphia in 1865 to John J. and Catharine (née Creswell) Dovey. In 1907, the Dovey brothers purchased the club from Arthur Soden. After becoming principal owner upon the death of his brother in 1909, he sold the franchise to John P. Harris one season later.

References

Baseball executives
Boston Braves (baseball)
Year of death missing
1865 births